Xylesthia is a genus of moths belonging to the family Tineidae.

Species
Xylesthia albicans Braun, 1923
Xylesthia horridula Zeller, 1877
Xylesthia menidias Meyrick, 1922
Xylesthia pruniramiella Clemens, 1859

References

Tineidae
Tineidae genera